Aka/Darbari/Java: Magic Realism is a 1983 album by American trumpet player and composer Jon Hassell, released on the label Editions EG. It was co-produced by Daniel Lanois and features Abdou M'Boup on drums.

Background
The album features Hassell manipulating and looping fragments of sampled sound. In the liner notes, Hassell describes the album as "a proposal for a 'coffee-colored' classical music of the future."

The cover painting is by Mati Klarwein.

Reception

AllMusic's Brian Olewnick described the album as "an insinuating blend of early-'80s high tech with ancient Southeast Asia," calling it "an early high-water mark at the juncture between world and ambient musics." For The Village Voice, Robert Christgau called it "dandy background music--more fluid and organic than Dream Theory in Malaya if also more amorphous than his first Eno collaboration."

In his 1995 book Ocean of Sound, David Toop writes that on Aka/Darbari/Java "the perfume of ethnopoetics was supplemented by parallels with literature and the advanced technology of hyperreality."

Tracklist
All tracks composed by Jon Hassell unless otherwise noted.
"Empire I" - 2:00
"Empire II" (Hassell, Daniel Lanois) - 4:53
"Empire III" - 7:09
"Empire IV" - 5:13
"Empire V" - 3:40
"Darbari Extension I" - 13:52
"Darbari Extension II" - 7:23

Personnel
Jon Hassell - trumpet, keyed voices and instruments, treatments, producer
Daniel Lanois - recording engineer, mixing and treatments, co-producer
Abdou M'Boup - drums
Bob Lanois, Michael Brook, John Forbes - assistance (Toronto) 
Bruno Planet - drum recording engineer (Paris)
Greg Calbi - mastering
Jean-Michel Reusser - project coordinator
Mati Klarwein - artwork
Paula Greif - design
Wynn Dan - design assistant

References

1983 albums
Jon Hassell albums
E.G. Records albums
Albums with cover art by Mati Klarwein